Murphy is a given name which may refer to:

People
 Murphy J. Foster (1849-1921), 31st Governor of Louisiana from 1892 to 1900
 Murphy Jensen (born 1968), American business owner and former professional tennis player
 Murphy Anderson (1926-2015), was an American comics artist, known as one of the premier inkers of his era.

Fictional characters
 Murphy Brown, the title character from the TV show Murphy Brown played by Candice Bergen
 Murphy Cooper, in the film Interstellar (2014)
 Murphy MacManus, one of the two main characters from the movie The Boondock Saints
 Murphy Pendleton, the protagonist of the video game Silent Hill: Downpour
 the title character of Murphy, Samuel Beckett's first published novel

See also 
 Murphy (surname)